New Cairo is a new satellite city in the Eastern Area of Cairo, Egypt, administered by the New Urban Communities Authority. The city was established in the year 2000 by merging three new towns (The First, Third and Fifth Settlements, translit. Al-Tagammu' al-awwal, al-thalith, al-khames,  Arabic:التجمع الأول والثالث والخامس), originally on an area of about 67,000 acres which had grown to 85,000 acres by 2016. According to the 2017 census, New Cairo had 297,387 residents across three qisms (police wards).

The city could eventually host a population of 5 million. When compared to 6th of October, also built with the hopes of alleviating the strain on Cairo, more homes are being rented out in New Cairo than in 6 October.

History
On 27 April 2016, President Abdel Fattah Al-Sisi inaugurated the new headquarters of the Ministry of the Interior in New Cairo.

Geography
Of particular significance to geologists is the Petrified Forest Protected Area, located in the vicinity of New Cairo. It is a protected site.

Economy and utilities
There are dozens of factories in New Cairo. GE is working with the American University in New Cairo on energy initiatives. El Sewedy Electric has its headquarters in the Fifth Settlement of New Cairo.

The city is connected to other cities by a vast network of bus lines, and construction has begun for a monorail line that connects the city with the Cairo suburb of Nasr City to the west, and the New Administrative Capital to the east. The city gets its drinking water from a water plant in Obour City, nearby.

A branch of Al Ahly SC is currently under construction in the eastern part of the city. There is also a championship golf course with tennis facilities lies in the Kattameya section of New Cairo.

At the entrance of New Cairo is Cairo Festival City, a 285 hectare (700 acres) real estate development which has parks, games, pools, gardens, walkways, business office space, a large mall and a dancing fountain. In addition to that, there are many other malls in New Cairo including Point 90, Downtown Kattameya, Porto Cairo, Emerald Plaza and Park mall, in addition to numerous other, smaller malls.

The government has also moved many services and administrations to the city, the most notable of which were the Traffic Administration offices of Nasr City, Heliopolis and New Cairo (which was previously located in El Shorouk) in 2020, as they were all moved into one three-floor building in the southern part of the city.

Sports 
The city is home to two professional football clubs who play their home matches in the city: ENPPI SC formed in 1985, and plays at Petrosport Stadium in New Cairo, and the other team is Pyramids FC which plays their home matches and have their training facilities in 30 June Stadium in New Cairo.

Religion
There are several mosques in New Cairo, but currently only one church, the Virgin Mary and St. Bishoy Coptic Church in the Fifth Settlement. The city is also home to a Coptic monastery, the Patmos Monastery of St. John the Beloved. In September 2016, the president approved the construction of a new Coptic Orthodox church in the city.

Education

Schools
 British International College of Cairo
 The American International School in Egypt (AIS) East (Main) Campus 
 New Cairo British International School (NCBIS)
 International School of Choueifat (ISC) – Cairo campus
 Modern Education Schools (MES).
 Salahaldin International School (SIS)
 Lycée Français du Caire New Cairo Primary Campus
  (카이로한국학교), a South Korean international school
 Canadian International School of Egypt
 Malvern College Egypt
 Gateway International Montessori School
 Cairo English School
 Europa-Schule Kairo
 Europaschule Neu Kairo
 Repton Cairo 
 Nile International College

Universities
 American University in Cairo (AUC)
 German University in Cairo (GUC)
 Future University in Egypt (FUE)
 Canadian International College (CIC)
 New Cairo Academy

Gated Communities
 Mostakbal City, 11,000 acres
 Madinaty, 8000 acres
 Al-Rehab, 3000 acres
 Qattamia Heights
 Mivida New Cairo by Emaar Misr
 Hyde Park New Cairo, 1000 acres
 Mountain View Hyde Park, Mountain View 2 & Mountain View iCity
 Les Rois
 Taj City
 Eastown & Villette by SODIC
 Katameya Heights New Cairo & Katameya Dunes New Cairo
 The Square
 Stone Park & Stone Residence by Rooya
 Lake View & Lake View Residence
 Palm Hills Katameya & Palm Hills New Cairo
 Riviera
 Azad
 Regent's Park

Malls
 Cairo Festival City by Al-Futtaim Group
 Mirage Mall
 Point 90 Mall
 5A, WaterWay and WaterWay 2 
 Downtown Mall
 Garden 8
 Concorde Mall
 The Drive by The Waterway

References

 
Populated places in Cairo Governorate
Cities in Egypt
New towns in Egypt